Belitz may refer to:

People
Semyon Belitz-Geiman (born 1945), Soviet Olympic medal-winning swimmer
Todd Belitz (born 1975), American Major League Baseball pitcher

Places
Klein Belitz, a municipality in Germany